"Boy in the Moon" is a song from New Zealand singer Margaret Urlich. The song was released in July 1992 as the lead single from her second studio album, Chameleon Dreams. The song peaked at number 21 in Australia and number 9 in New Zealand.

In 1993, British female trio Asia Blue (who also worked with Barry Blue) covered the song and released it as a single, but it failed to chart.

Track listing 
CD single/7" (Columbia 6579732)
 "Boy in the Moon" – 5:06
 "Make It Last" – 4:30
 "Boy in the Moon" (Over the Moon Version) – 6:25

Charts

References

External links 
 Boy in the Moon at Discogs

1992 songs
1992 singles
Margaret Urlich songs
Columbia Records singles
Songs written by Barry Blue
Songs written by Robyn Smith (record producer)